Amphritea opalescens is a Gram-negative bacterium from the genus of Amphritea which has been isolated from sediments from the beach of Jasper from the Fildes Peninsula.

References

Oceanospirillales
Bacteria described in 2019